The Knoxville Cherokees were an East Coast Hockey League (ECHL) team based in Knoxville, Tennessee.

History
The franchise was formed in 1988 along with the ECHL. The team moved to Florence, South Carolina in 1997 and was renamed the Pee Dee Pride.

Market previously served by: Knoxville Knights of the EHL (1961-68)
Franchise replaced by: Knoxville Speed of the UHL (1999-02)

Season-by-Season record
Note: GP = Games played, W = Wins, L = Losses, T = Ties, OTL = Overtime losses/Shootout losses, Pts = Points, GF = Goals for, GA = Goals against, PIM = Penalties in minutes

Playoffs
1988–89: Lost to Johnstown 4-0 in semifinals.
1989–90: Did not qualify.
1990–91: Lost to Louisville 3-1 in quarterfinals.
1991–92: Did not qualify.
1992–93: Did not qualify.
1993–94: Lost to Louisville 3-1 in first round.
1994–95: Lost to Roanoke 3-1 in first round.
1995–96: Defeated Nashville 3-2 in first round; lost to Toledo 3-0 in quarterfinals.

Team records
Goals: 63 Stan Drulia (1990-91)
Assists: 93 Daniel Gauthier (1990-91)
Points: 140 Stan Drulia (1990-91)
Penalty Minutes: 443 Grant Chorney (1992-93)
GAA: 2.00 Steve Averill (1989-90)
SV%: .941 Rick Robus (1996-97)
Career Goals: 123 Mike Murray
Career Assists: 164 Mike Murray
Career Points: 287 Mike Murray
Career Penalty Minutes: 768 Greg Batters
Career Goaltending Wins: 66 Cory Cadden
Career Shutouts: 3 Dean Anderson
Career Games: 262 Mike Murray

External links
The Internet Hockey Database - Knoxville Cherokees (ECHL)

Defunct ECHL teams
Sports in Knoxville, Tennessee
Defunct ice hockey teams in the United States
Ice hockey clubs established in 1988
Sports clubs disestablished in 1997
Ice hockey teams in Tennessee
1988 establishments in Tennessee
1997 disestablishments in Tennessee
Tampa Bay Lightning minor league affiliates